Arílson de Paula Nunes (born October 30, 1971), better known as Paulo Nunes, is a Brazilian football pundit and retired footballer who played as a forward.

Club career

Flamengo

A product of Flamengo's youth system, Paulo Nunes was part of a remarkable generation of players revealed by the Gávea team, such as Djalminha, Júnior Baiano, Marquinhos, Nélio, Marcelinho Carioca and Sávio. However, Paulo Nunes did not achieve stardom in Flamengo, and only went to achieve success in other clubs, as it was the case with his former youth team teammates. Paulo Nunes, however, won the 1990 Copa do Brasil with the Rio club, the 1991 Campeonato Carioca and finally the 1992 Campeonato Brasileiro Série A.

Grêmio

Paulo Nunes left Flamengo in 1995, moving on to Grêmio, where he joined another player who had left a Rio de Janeiro club, Jardel. Alongside him, Paulo Nunes formed one of the most effective attacking duos in Grêmio history.

At Grêmio, Paulo Nunes lived the most glorious time in career, winning two Campeonato Gaúcho titles, the Copa Libertadores cup, the Campeonato Brasileiro, the Recopa Sul-Americana and the Copa do Brasil for the Porto Alegre team and being the lead scorer in the 1996 Campeonato Brasileiro and the 1997 Copa do Brasil. His good form also earned him the Bola de Prata from Placar magazine, also earning him a place in the national team squad for the 1997 Copa América.

Return to Brazil and success at Palmeiras

After departing from Grêmio in 1997, he went on to play for the Portuguese club S.L. Benfica. However, injuries and clashes with the rest of the squad hastened his return to Brazil.
In 1998, Paulo Nunes joined Palmeiras. Joining Atlético Paranaense recruited Oséas in the attack, Paulo Nunes went on to win the 1998 Copa do Brasil, the third one in his career, the Copa Mercosul and also the 1999 Copa Libertadores. After the defeat against Manchester United for the Intercontinental Cup, Paulo Nunes left Palmeiras.

Departure from Palmeiras

Paulo Nunes returned to Grêmio for one season with no great fanfare. Afterwards, he played for Corinthians, Gama, Al Nassr and Mogi Mirim, where he retired in 2003, at the age of 32.

International career

Paulo Nunes played his first game for the Brazil national team on 3 June 1997, when his country and France drew 1–1 for the Tournoi de France. Paulo Nunes second and last game for the country was the June 29, 1997 Copa América final against Bolivia, when his team beat the opponent team 3–1. In doing so his 1997 Brazil national team  won the Copa América.

Career statistics

International

Honours

Club
Flamengo
 Copa São Paulo de Futebol Júnior: 1990
 Copa do Brasil: 1990
 Copa Rio: 1991
 Campeonato Carioca: 1991
 Campeonato Brasileiro: 1992

Grêmio
 Campeonato Gaúcho: 1995, 1996
 Copa Libertadores da América: 1995
 Recopa Sul-Americana: 1996
 Campeonato Brasileiro: 1996
 Copa do Brasil: 1997

Palmeiras
 Copa do Brasil: 1998
 Copa Mercosul: 1998
 Copa Libertadores da América: 1999

Corinthians
 Campeonato Paulista: 2001

International
Brazil
 Copa América: 1997

Individual

 Bola de Prata Placar winner: 1996
 Campeonato Brasileiro top scorer (16 goals): 1996
 Copa do Brasil top scorer (9 goals): 1997

References

External links

 
 

1971 births
Living people
Sportspeople from Goiás
Brazilian footballers
Brazil international footballers
Brazilian expatriate footballers
Campeonato Brasileiro Série A players
Primeira Liga players
CR Flamengo footballers
Grêmio Foot-Ball Porto Alegrense players
S.L. Benfica footballers
Sociedade Esportiva Palmeiras players
Sport Club Corinthians Paulista players
Al Nassr FC players
Mogi Mirim Esporte Clube players
Expatriate footballers in Portugal
Expatriate footballers in Saudi Arabia
Copa América-winning players
Copa Libertadores-winning players
1997 Copa América players
Association football forwards
The Farm (TV series) contestants